Among Markov chain Monte Carlo (MCMC) algorithms, coupling from the past is a method for sampling from the stationary distribution of a Markov chain. Contrary to many MCMC algorithms, coupling from the past gives in principle a perfect sample from the stationary distribution. It was invented by James Propp and David Wilson in 1996.

The basic idea
Consider a finite state irreducible aperiodic Markov chain  with state space  and (unique) stationary distribution  ( is a probability vector). An example of such a probability distribution is the one where  is independent from  whenever , but it is often worthwhile to consider other distributions.

(We do not worry for now where this  is coming from.) Define 

In other words,  for each . The algorithm then involves finding some  such that  is a singleton, and outputting the element of that singleton.

The monotone case
There is a special class of Markov chains in which there are particularly good choices
(Here  denotes cardinality.) Suppose that  is a partially ordered set with order , which has a unique minimal element  and a unique maximal element ; that is, every  satisfies . Also, suppose that  may be chosen to be supported on the set of monotone maps . Then it is easy to see that  if and only if , since  is monotone. Thus, checking this becomes rather easy. The algorithm can proceed by choosing  for some constant , sampling the maps , and outputting  if . If  the algorithm proceeds by doubling  and repeating as necessary until an output is obtained. (But the algorithm does not resample the maps  which were already sampled; it uses the previously sampled maps when needed.)

References 

Monte Carlo methods
Markov chain Monte Carlo